Bishop O'Byrne High School is a Roman Catholic high school located in Calgary, Alberta operated under the jurisdiction of the Calgary Catholic School District. The school's designated boundaries include the deep southwest communities of Calgary like Bridlewood, Millrise, and Shawnessy, and southeast quadrants of Calgary like Midnapore, McKenzie Lake, and Sundance.

History
In mid 1990s, the provincial government approved funding for a new high schools to be built in order to serve the expanding south communities of Calgary. Bishop O’Byrne High School opened on September 4, 2001.

The school is named after the sixth bishop of Calgary, His Excellency Bishop Paul O’Byrne.

Academics
The school offers a grade 10 Honours/International Baccalaureate (IB) Diploma Programme.

Athletics
Bishop O'Byrne Bobcats participates as a Division I member school in the Calgary Senior High School Athletic Association (student body populous 1700+) and the Alberta Schools Athletic Association.

The school offers a specialize and designate Sports Performance Hockey Program.

References

External links
Bishop O'Byrne High Official Web Site
The Calgary Catholic School District Official Site
Alberta Schools' Athletic Association
Calgary Senior High School Athletic Association

High schools in Calgary
Catholic secondary schools in Alberta
Educational institutions established in 2001
2001 establishments in Alberta